Mesolita interrupta is a species of beetle in the family Cerambycidae. It was described by Lea in 1918. It is known from Australia.

References

Parmenini
Beetles described in 1918